Julian Holland may refer to:

 Jools Holland (Julian Miles Holland, born 1958), English musician and television presenter
 Julian Holland (journalist) (1925–2001), British journalist and radio editor
 Julian Holland (boxer) (born 1972), Australia boxer
 Julian Holland (author) (born 1946), English author